The Student Teachers is a 1973 film directed by Jonathan Kaplan. It was inspired by the "nurse" cycle of pictures starting with The Student Nurses (1970). Roger Corman says it was one of the best of the cycle.

Plot
Three new high school teachers use unconventional methods to get through to their students. Rachel teaches after-school sex education; Tracey gets involved with nude photography; Jody recruits a former drop out to help with a half-way house and gets involved with a drug ring.

Cast

Production

Development and writing
Jon Davison says a script was apparently written by Stephanie Rothman and Charles S. Swartz, but no one who worked on the film ever saw it. A draft was written by Kaplan and Danny Opatoshu, but Corman asked for it to be rewritten.

It was shot in 15 days for under $100,000, including three days shooting at the Paramount Ranch. Corman removed a number of jokes from the final chase sequence so it was played straighter.

Kaplan later said "When I looked at the filmographies of the directors I admired, I noticed that they made a hell of a lot of movies before they made a good one. And I made the decision consciously to make as many movies as I could in as short a period of time as I could"

Casting
The lead was written for Patti Byrne who was in Kaplan's earlier Night Call Nurses but she did not commit and the role ended up being played by Susan Damante. Kaplan's sister Nora Heflin and mother Frances Heflin are in the cast and share a scene together. Chuck Norris plays the small role of the karate advisor.

Critical responses
Writing in the Chicago Reader, film critic Dave Kehr described the film as "an ugly, exploitative downer," but that director Kaplan "puts some infectious high spirits into the incidental action [...] it seems a shame when the film is forced to stop every 10 or 15 minutes so the three lead actresses can take off their shirts." Critic Tyler Foster wrote in DVD Talk that the film was "a slog" and that "there's not enough of a connection between teaching and mobsters to justify shoehorning this material into the film."

See also
 List of American films of 1973

References

External links

1973 films
Films directed by Jonathan Kaplan
New World Pictures films
American high school films
Films produced by Julie Corman
1970s sex comedy films
1973 comedy films
American sex comedy films
1970s English-language films
1970s American films